The Special Intelligence Service was a covert counterintelligence branch of the United States Federal Bureau of Investigation (FBI) located in South America during World War II. It was established to monitor the activities of Nazi and pro-Nazi groups in Central and South America. The organization was a forerunner to the Central Intelligence Agency.

In 1934, US President Franklin D. Roosevelt  became concerned about the activities of Nazi groups within the United States. The FBI was ordered to begin investigating these groups operating within the country. The goal of this work was to determine if foreign agents were working within these pro-Nazi groups. In 1940, the government decided to expand the scope of this mission. There were more than 1.5 million expatriate/ethnic Germans living in South America, including Argentina and Brazil. As a result, this area had become an active area of Axis espionage, propaganda and sabotage. In June 1940, Roosevelt ordered the formation of the Special Intelligence Service to monitor these activities.

It is commonly assumed that Assistant Director Percy E. "Sam" Foxworth was the first Chief of the SIS. He and SIS agent Harold Dennis Haberfeld died in a plane crash on 15 January 1943. The second Chief appears to have been Jerome Doyle.

The front for the organization was a law firm, the Importers and Exporters Service Company, which operated out of room 4332 of the International Building, 30 Rockefeller Center (a.k.a. the RCA Building), from August 1940. The organization took some time to become fully operational, due to language and cultural differences, but within a year the SIS had a number of agents in place under various covers.

Following the war the SIS was disbanded, having been in operation in 1940–1946. After it was disbanded, its region of operation was incorporated into the responsibilities of the newly formed Central Intelligence Agency. Concurrently, the FBI would expand its own primarily domestic counterintelligence  role to hunt spies and combat espionage.

Activities
This organization placed more than 340 undercover agents in regions of Latin America. They operated for seven years, and by 1946 a total of 887 Axis spies had been discovered. Also found were 281 agents of Axis propaganda, 222 smugglers shipping important war materials, and more than 100 saboteurs and other operatives. It located 24 secret Axis radio stations and confiscated 40 radio transmitters and 18 receiving sets.

In Latin America, the SIS worked with the Basque Intelligence Service (BIS), which had been established by Spanish Basques, living in exile as a result of the Spanish Civil War.

Argentina 
The SIS oversaw the destruction of the Abwehr radio HDZ, which transmitted messages to Nazi receiving stations in Europe. It was instrumental in breaking the code of the German Enigma machine.

Bolivia 
An investigation labeled the "Jar case" remains classified.

Chile 
German radio transmitter PQZ was silenced. Guiflermo Hellemann, one of the leader of the spy and sabotage ring was deported to the United States and interrogated.

Colombia 
The apprehension of a German agent in Colombia led to the identification of German agents in the United States.

Cuba 
The SIS report:

Paraguay 
On 31 March 1945, Special Agent Jeremiah Cordes Delworth was "presently serving" as the FBI Legal Attache in Asuncion, Paraguay. He died in a plane crash on 3 December 1945 near Laguna Ibera, Santo Tome, Corrientes Provence, Argentina. The Argentine Death Certificate gives the names of Gordon Brittain Whelplay and Richard William Scheitzer as witnesses.

The aircraft of the crash was a U.S. Army C-47, No. 8602. According to Argentine reports, bad weather was the cause.  Fourteen were killed in the crash. The flight was from Asuncion to Montevideo, Uruguay. The pilot was Lt. Orville Mitchelsen of California and 3 crew members. The other military victims were Lt. Zane Glicher of Massilon, Ohio; Lt. Chester Lowe of Washington, D. C.; Lt. William Nunnemaker of Kansas; Lt. Ruben Klein of New York; Sgt. James Roberson of St. Louis, Mo.; Sgt. Clarence Setko of Superior, Wis.; Sgt. Richard Schweitzer of Gloversvflle, N. Y.; Cpl. Frank Dubinskas of MeKees Rocks, Pa.; Cpl. David Kellogg of Newtonville, Mass.; Charles Brown and E. S. King, crew members, and (first name unavailable) Leopold. The burned aircraft was found in rough country twenty-three miles south of the hamlet of Pellegrini.

The purpose of the military passengers was a U.S. Army "geodetic mission". A geodetic mission collects Geodetic datum.

It was deemed too difficult to recover the bodies and a gasoline can was parachuted to the search party that located the wrecked plane for the purpose of cremation.

Venezuela 
Ten sabotage agents were interned in the town of Rubino by the Venezuelan government.

Special Agent Robert Howard Calhoun arrived in Venezuela on his first SIS assignment on February 18, 1943.  He was assigned as Vice Consul in Ciudad Bolivar, Venezuela, as a cover story.  While in Ciudad Bolivar, Agent Calhoun handled investigations involving espionage, sabotage, subversive activity and diamond smuggling.

After ten months, he was transferred to Caracas as Assistant Legal Attache.  In January, 1944, all cases relating to political and Communist activity were assigned to him.  Thomas J. Maleady, Second Secretary of the United States Embassy, was dependent upon Calhoun's reports for his information.

Calhoun developed contacts and confidential informants.  Many contacts and confidential informants developed by him in Ciudad Bolivar continued to furnish him with information, although he was not able to contact then personally while in Caracas.

Calhoun led and directed raids against fascists and participated in dangerous assignments.  He later transferred to the New York City FBI division, probably around October 1944.

Germany 
The Safehaven Project identified the transfer of capital out of Germany.

See also
The Office of Special Investigations was a unit within the Criminal Division of the United States Department of Justice which detects and investigates individuals who took part in state sponsored-acts committed in violation of public international law, such as crimes against humanity. The OSI primarily focused on acts by Nazis abroad before and during World War II, and who subsequently entered, or seek to enter, the United States illegally or fraudulently. However, in 2010, the Office was merged with the Domestic Security Section to form a new unit of the Criminal Division: the Human Rights and Special Prosecutions Section.

References

Further reading
 Batvinis, Raymond. The Origins of FBI Counterintelligence. Lawrence, KS: University Press of Kansas, 2007.
 Highet, Gilbert, Tom Hill, and Roald Dahl. British Security Coordination. Edited by Giles Playfair. London: St. Ermin's Press, 1998.

External links
The FBI's Special Intelligence Service, 1940-1946
Prologue: Fleming by Mark Riebling.
Kenneth Crosby, former SIS agent.

United States intelligence agencies